St Michael's Church is an Anglican place of worship situated on Bailiffgate in the town of Alnwick in Northumberland, England. The current building dates from the 15th century but a 12th-century Norman chapel stood on the site prior to this; reports of an earlier 8th-century Saxon chapel are unconfirmed. The church is dedicated to St Michael the Archangel, in earlier times it was also dedicated to St Mary as well. It is a Grade I listed building which is included in the book “England's Thousand Best Churches".

History

Church founded

The first written mention of a church on the site is found in a charter of 1147 in which Eustace fitz John endowed the newly founded Alnwick Abbey with various gifts including the Chapel of Alnwick. Very few remnants of this Norman chapel are visible in the present day church, some surviving stones with a diaper pattern are built into the chancel. The 1863 restoration revealed some buried basements of pillars in the late Norman style of architecture which existed in the first half of the 12th century. Old foundations were also exposed by the 1863 restoration which confirmed that the Norman chapel had a long, narrow nave and a small apse. The church suffered severe damage from Scottish raids during the first half of the 14th century during the Wars of Scottish Independence. The second half of the century saw repair work undertaken which saw the present nave built and the addition of the north aisle as well as the construction of the north wall all in the Decorated style

15th century

The 15th century saw the majority of the present day church built, evidence suggest that the old church was in a ruinous state by this time. Towards the end of the 14th century the Decorated style of architecture was replaced by the Perpendicular style and it is in this design that most of the new church was built. Financial aid for the rebuild came directly from the monarch King Henry VI who issued a charter in 1464 granting the Burgesses of Alnwick a port at Alnmouth with tolls on exports from it, plus a fair and market at Alnwick that besides doing other work they might "make and repair their church". The substantial money brought in from this Royal grant enabled the Burgesses of Alnwick to turn St Michael's into one of the finest examples of the Perpendicular style of architecture in the north. The highlight of the 15th century work was the impressive and spacious chancel with its octagonal pillars which are elaborately sculptured.

Restorations of 1782 and 1818

There were no further changes to the church until the latter years of the 18th century when Hugh Percy, 1st Duke of Northumberland after renovating Alnwick Castle, repaired the chancel using his own architect Vincent Shepherd (1750–1812) assisted by Italian craftsmen. The work included a new window in the middle of the east end, a fan vaulted plaster ceiling and oak stalls for the Duke and his family. A revival in church attendance in the early part of the 19th century led to a statement in 1811 by the church councillors that accommodation was insufficient. As a result of this, a sum of £2,000 was spent in 1818 increasing the capacity to 1,200, this was achieved by removing the small galleries and adding a large one at the west end. Funds for this project came from a large donation from Hugh Percy, 3rd Duke of Northumberland, other money was raised through the church rates and the sale of seats.

Salvin's restoration of 1863

When Algernon Percy, 4th Duke of Northumberland was restoring Alnwick Castle between 1854 and 1865 he agreed to finance the restoration of St Michael's. The restoration started in 1863 and was overseen by Anthony Salvin who was also directing the work on the castle. Salvin swept away many of the mistakes of the two previous restorations, removing the plaster ceilings and the gallery. He strengthened some areas of the church and reinstated four pillars and the pointed arches to the nave which had been removed in the 1818 renewal, he also replaced some of the Decorated windows with ones in the Perpendicular style. The chancel aisle was filled with oak pews donated by the Duke.

Features

Exterior

One of the most eye catching exterior items is at the south east corner where there is an unusual lookout turret which was used to warn of raiders during the border conflicts. The turret was used in conjunction with Heiferlaw Peel tower, four miles to the north, which had a wide view of the borders and gave an early warning of any attack. The turret was again utilised in the early part of the 19th century when a landing by Napoleon’s army was feared and a series of beacons were set up around the country. The main tower stands at the west end of the church on foundations which go 30 to 40 feet below the surface, it is squat looking with battlements.

Interior

The interior features two statues which were dug up from the foundations during the 1818 restoration, they were minus the heads and have modern replacements. One is of Henry VI and the other one is either Saint Sebastian or Maurice, a local saint martyred by the Danes. There are several Medieval grave slabs built into the wall, the oldest of these dates from the 13th century. Below the west window is the modern font made from Kilkenny blue-black limestone by David Edwick of Hexham, it was a gift for the new millennium. A small window to the right of the west window has fragments of medieval glass from the 14th century within it. The rest of the stained glass comes from the 19th century and contains what is described by Nikolaus Pevsner as "an uncommonly complete and enlightening survey of 19th century glass"; it includes work by well-known makers Clayton and Bell, Lavers and Barraud, James Powell and Sons and Ward and Hughes. The east end of the church features St Catherine's Chapel and the altar. The chapel has an interesting pillar featuring the Percy and de Vesci arms and a carving of St Catherine and the wheel on which she was martyred, it is called the Hotspur Capital and remembers Harry Hotspur, the famous warrior and son of the First Earl.

References

Church of England church buildings in Northumberland
Grade I listed churches in Northumberland
Churches completed in 1464
15th-century church buildings in England